Stratford Downtown is a census-designated place (CDP) corresponding to the town center of Stratford, Fairfield County, Connecticut, United States. U.S. Route 1 (Barnum Avenue) runs east–west through the center of the CDP, and Interstate 95 forms the southeastern border, with access from Exit 32 (West Broad Street) at the southern limit of the CDP and from Exit 33 (US 1 and Connecticut Route 130) at the eastern limit. The Stratford Center Historic District falls outside the CDP, just to the south.

Stratford Downtown was first listed as a CDP prior to the 2020 census.

References 

Census-designated places in Fairfield County, Connecticut
Census-designated places in Connecticut